Buzara infractafinis  is a moth of the family Erebidae. It is found in Australia.

The larvae feed on Breynia species.

References

External links
Image

Calpinae
Moths described in 1894